Sir Esme Tatton Cecil Brinton (4 January 1916 – 26 September 1985) was a British Conservative Party politician.

At the 1964 general election, Brinton was elected as Member of Parliament for Kidderminster.  He was re-elected twice, before stepping down at the February 1974 general election, when he was succeeded by the Conservative candidate Esmond Bulmer.

References
Times Guide to the House of Commons, 1983

External links 

Conservative Party (UK) MPs for English constituencies
UK MPs 1964–1966
UK MPs 1966–1970
UK MPs 1970–1974
1916 births
1985 deaths